KFVE (channel 6) is a television station licensed to Kailua-Kona, Hawaii, United States, serving the Hawaiian Islands as an affiliate of the Spanish-language Telemundo network. It is owned by Gray Television alongside CBS affiliate KGMB (channel 5) and NBC affiliate KHNL (channel 13). The stations share studios on Waiakamilo Road in Honolulu's Kapālama neighborhood, while KFVE's transmitter is located near Kalaoa, Hawaii.

KFVE serves a  area, and covers an estimated population of 71,400. The station's signal is relayed on satellite station KLEI, channel 21 in Wailuku (owned by Mango Broadcasting and operated by Gray under a local marketing agreement (LMA)), on KHNL's sixth digital subchannel, and on KKAI's second digital subchannel.

History
The station went on the air in 1988 as KVHF, a satellite of Mauna Kea Broadcasting's KMGT channel 26, and changed its call letters to KLEI on March 9, 1992. The station was affiliated with Pax TV/i/Ion (as a satellite of KPXO-TV), and later with The Family Channel in 2011.

On October 19, 2012, KLEI was granted statewide must-carry status on the Oceanic Time Warner Cable (now Spectrum) and Hawaiian Telcom cable services, provided it delivers a good quality signal to the cable television headends.

In late 2017, KLEI dropped its Family Channel affiliation and became Hawaii's first over-the-air affiliate of Spanish-language network Telemundo, filling a void in the market for a Spanish language station that opened up when KHLU-CD (a Univision affiliate) ceased operations in 2016. Shortly after assuming the Telemundo affiliation, KLEI became available on all cable systems in Hawaii for the first time.

On December 3, 2018, the station's call sign changed to KSIX-TV.

On July 8, 2020, Gray Television, owner of Honolulu-based stations KGMB and KHNL and their satellites, agreed to purchase KSIX-TV for $1 million, pending approval of the Federal Communications Commission (FCC). Maui-based satellite KLEI was not included in the sale. The transaction was finalized on September 9. The call letters of KSIX-TV and Hilo's KFVE were switched on November 13.

Subchannel

References

Television channels and stations established in 1988
FVE
1988 establishments in Hawaii
Telemundo network affiliates
Gray Television